Isabel ravana is a species of plant bug, a type of insect in the family Miridae. It is the only accepted species in the genus Isabel.

References

Mirinae